Lian "Jenifer" Qian (born 19 February 1983) is a female Chinese-born table tennis player who now represents the Dominican Republic.

She competed at the 2008 Summer Olympics, reaching the first round of the singles competition. She also competed in the team competition.

References

External links
 
 

1983 births
Living people
Dominican Republic female table tennis players
Table tennis players at the 2007 Pan American Games
Table tennis players at the 2008 Summer Olympics
Olympic table tennis players of the Dominican Republic
Lian Qian
Pan American Games bronze medalists for the Dominican Republic
Pan American Games medalists in table tennis
Table tennis players from Jiangsu
People from Zhenjiang
Naturalised table tennis players
Medalists at the 2007 Pan American Games